Midway is an unincorporated community in Mecklenburg County, Virginia. It lies at an elevation of 371 feet (113 m).

References

Unincorporated communities in Mecklenburg County, Virginia
Unincorporated communities in Virginia